The Women in Business Award is a biannual award given by the United Nations Conference on Trade and Development (UNCTAD). The competition is restricted to women who have taken part in the EMPRETEC programme. It was first awarded in 2008.

2018
The winner of the Gold award in 2018 was Uneiza Ali lssufo, a civil engineer from Mozambique whose contracting company, ConsMoz Lda, employs 800 people. The award was presented in Geneva in October 2018. The judges singled out the emphasis on green construction and the jobs that she had created for women in particular. Issufo and the two runners-up will receive a watch, mentoring and special training. 
The Silver award was given to Ms. Lama Sha'sha'a from Jordan. She is the founder of International Robotics Academy. The Bronze award was given to Ms. Barbara Ofwono Buyondo, the Principal and founder of Victorious Education Services in Uganda. Two Special recognition awards were also given. Ms. Chandra Vadhana R from India, founder and CEO of 4TuneFactory and Prayaana Labs won a special recognition in Social entrepreneurship for her works done in enabling skill development of girls and women. Ms. Rosana Marques, founder of Ouseuse from Brazil won her special recognition for Export Potential. The Awards were given on October 25 at the Pales Des Nations, Geneva in the presence of dignitaries including Mr. Mukhisa Kituyi, the Secretary-General of UNCTAD.

The other 2018 finalists were 
Rosana Marques (Brazil): Ouseuse, swimwear and lingerie
Rocio Castro Fernandez (Ecuador): Momoa, clothes for breastfeeding 
Ndey Fatou Njie (The Gambia): TiGA, swimwear
Chandra Vadhana (India): Skill development, training, assessments and HR consulting
Lama Sha'sha'a (Jordan): International Robotics Academy, education for 6-16-year-olds in robotics and STEM
Barbara Ofwono Buyondo (Uganda): Victorious Education Services, kindergarten to primary school education
Ana de León (Uruguay): Ruta 10 Upcycling, up-cycling design company 
Rina Arráez (Venezuela): Inversiones Alces 1012 C.A., handmade recycled accessories
Leah Diana Mitaba (Zambia): Butterfly Initiatives, produces vegetables and fruits.

History
Previous winners have been
2016: Tran Thi Viet Viet Trang Weaving Handicrafts, Vietnam. Awarded in Nairobi.
2014: Lina Jalil Khalifeh, SheFighter, Jordan
2012: Melissa de Leon, Panama Gourmet, Panama
2010: Beatrice Ayuru Byaruhanga, Lira Integrated School, Uganda
2008: Sana Zaal Burgan, Med Grant, Jordan.

See also

 List of awards honoring women

References
 

Awards established in 2008
United Nations awards
Awards honoring women